The Battle of Manlian Pass took place between Romans under Q. Fulvius Flaccus and Celtiberi in 181 BC.  Fulvius had arrived as praetor assigned to the province of Hispania Ulterior in 180, and continued as proconsul for the following two years. The fullest account of the battle is given by Livy (40.39-40):

As his successor was somewhat late in reaching Spain, Fulvius Flaccus led out his army from winter quarters and began to devastate the more distant parts of Celtiberia, where the inhabitants had not come in to surrender. By this action he irritated the natives more than he intimidated them, and secretly collecting a force they beset the Manlian Pass, through which they were tolerably certain that the Romans would march. Gracchus had instructed his colleague, L. Postumius Albinus, who was on his way to Further Spain, to inform Q. Fulvius that he was to bring his army to Tarraco, where he intended to disband the old soldiers, incorporate the reinforcements into the various corps and reorganise the whole army. Fulvius was also informed of the date of his successor's arrival which was close at hand. This information compelled Flaccus to abandon his projected operations and withdraw his army hastily from Celtiberia. The barbarians, ignorant of the true reason, and imagining that he had become aware of their rising and secret gathering in arms and was afraid of them, invested the pass all the more closely. When the Roman column entered the pass, the enemy rushed down upon it from both sides. As soon as Flaccus saw this, he allayed the first symptoms of tumult in the column by giving the order through the centurions for every man to stand where he was and get his weapons ready. The packs of the baggage animals were piled up in one place, and partly by his own exertions, partly through his officers, he got the whole force into such fighting order as the time and place required. He reminded his men that they had to deal with those who had twice made their submission and who were impelled by treachery, not by true courage. His soldiers, he told them, would have returned home without distinguishing themselves; the enemy had given them the chance of a glorious and memorable homecoming. They would carry in triumph through Rome swords reddened with the slaughter of their foes and spoils dripping with their blood. Time did not allow him to say more; the enemy were upon them and fighting was already begun at the outermost points. Then the two lines closed. 
40.40
The battle was everywhere a desperate one, but with changing fortunes. The legionaries fought splendidly, nor did the two divisions of allied troops offer a less vigorous resistance. The native auxiliaries confronted by men similarly armed, but somewhat better fighters, could not hold their ground. When the Celtiberi found that their regular order of battle made them no match for the legions, they bore down upon them in wedge-formation, a maneuver which gives them such weight that in whatever direction they carry their attack it cannot be withstood. Even the legions were now thrown into disorder and the Roman line was all but broken. Fulvius, seeing this, galloped up to the legionary cavalry and shouted: "Unless you can come to the rescue it will be all over with this army." "Say," they shouted in reply, "what you want done, we shall not be slack in carrying out your orders." He replied: "Close up your squadrons, cavalry of the two legions, and let your horses go where the enemy wedge is pressing our men. Your charge will have all the greater force if you make it on unbitted horses." (We have heard that Roman cavalry have often done that and covered themselves with glory.) They removed the horses' bits and charged the wedge in both directions, first forward and then back again, inflicting great slaughter upon the enemy and shivering all their spears. When the wedge on which all their hopes rested was broken up, the Celtiberi so completely lost heart that they gave up almost any attempt at fighting and began to look about for means of escape. When the auxiliary cavalry saw the notable feat of the Roman horse they, too, fired by the courage of the others, and without waiting for orders, spurred their horses against the enemy who was now thoroughly shaken. This proved decisive; the Celtiberi fled precipitately in all directions, and the Roman commander, watching them as they turned their backs, vowed a temple to Fortuna Equestris and the celebration of solemn Games to Jupiter Optimus Maximus. The Celtiberi, scattered in flight, were cut to pieces all through the pass. It is asserted that 17,000 of the enemy were killed on that day, and more than 4000 taken alive, together with 277 military standards and nearly 600 horses. The victorious army remained encamped in the pass. The victory was not without loss; 472 Roman soldiers, 1019 soldiers of the allies and 3000 native auxiliaries perished on the field. With its former glory thus renewed the victorious army marched to Tarraco. Tiberius Sempronius, who had landed two days before, went to meet Fulvius and congratulated him upon his successful conduct of affairs.

Battles involving the Roman Republic